The 2001 Montana Grizzlies football team represented the University of Montana – Missoula in the 2001 NCAA Division I-AA football season. The Grizzlies were led by second-year head coach Joe Glenn and played their home games at Washington–Grizzly Stadium.

Schedule

Roster

References

Montana
Montana Grizzlies football seasons
NCAA Division I Football Champions
Big Sky Conference football champion seasons
Montana Grizzlies football